Petaloconchus is a genus of sea snails, marine gastropod mollusks in the family Vermetidae, the worm snails or worm shells.

Species
Species within the genus Petaloconchus include:
 Petaloconchus apakadikike W. C. Kelly, 2007
 Petaloconchus caperatus (Tate & May, 1900)
 Petaloconchus cereus Carpenter, 1857
 Petaloconchus cochlidium Carpenter, 1857
 Petaloconchus compactus (Carpenter, 1864)
 Petaloconchus complicatus Dall, 1908
Petaloconchus erectus (Dall, 1888)
 Petaloconchus flavescens Carpenter, 1857
Petaloconchus floridanus Olsson & Harbison, 1953
Petaloconchus glomeratus (Linnaeus, 1758)
 Petaloconchus innumerabilis Pilsbry & Olsson, 1935
Petaloconchus interliratus Stearns, 1893
Petaloconchus intortus (Lamarck, 1818)
 Petaloconchus keenae Hadfield & Kay, 1972
 Petaloconchus lamellosus Ladd, 1972
 Petaloconchus laurae Scuderi, 2012
 Petaloconchus lilacinus (Mörch, 1862)
 Petaloconchus lilandikike W. C. Kelly, 2007
 Petaloconchus macrophragma Carpenter, 1857
Petaloconchus mcgintyi Olsson & Harbison, 1953
 Petaloconchus merkana Ladd, 1972
 Petaloconchus montereyensis Dall, 1919
 Petaloconchus myrakeenae Absalão & Rios, 1987
 Petaloconchus nerinaeoides Carpenter, 1857
Petaloconchus nigricans (Dall, 1884)
 Petaloconchus octosectus Carpenter, 1857
 Petaloconchus pachylasma (Mörch, 1862)
 Petaloconchus renisectus Carpenter, 1857
 † Petaloconchus sculpturatus H. C. Lea, 1843 
 Petaloconchus tokyoensis (Pilsbry, 1895)
Petaloconchus varians (d’Orbigny, 1839)≤
Species brought into synonymy
Petaloconchus adansoni (Daudin, 1800): synonym of Vermetus adansonii Daudin, 1800 (incorrect generic placement)
 Petaloconchus annulatus (Yokoyama, 1924): synonym of Vermetus annulatus Yokoyama, 1924
 Petaloconchus floridana [sic]: synonym of Petaloconchus floridanus Olsson & Harbison, 1953 (incorrect gender ending)

References

External links
 Lea H.C. (1843). Abstract of a paper read before the American Philosophical Society, May 29th, 1843, entitled "Descriptions of some new fossil shells, from the Tertiary of Petersburg, Virginia". H.C. Lea, Philadelphia. 12 pp
 Lea H.C. (1843). Description of some new fossil shells from the Tertiary of Virginia. Proceedings of the American Philosophical Society. 3: 162-165
 Carpenter, P. P. (1857). Catalogue of the collection of Mazatlan Mollusca in the British Museum collected by Frederick Reigen. London: British Museum. xvi + 552 pp
 Mörch, O. A. L. (1860). Beiträge zur Molluskenfauna Central-Amerika's. Malakozoologische Blätter. 7: 66–106
 Bieler, R.; Petit, R. E. (2011). Catalogue of Recent and fossil “worm-snail” taxa of the families Vermetidae, Siliquariidae, and Turritellidae (Mollusca: Caenogastropoda). Zootaxa. 2948, 1-103.

External links

Vermetidae
Gastropod genera